The Inclined Plane Bridge is a , Pennsylvania through truss bridge that spans Stonycreek River in Johnstown, Cambria County, in the U.S. state of Pennsylvania. It connects the city to the lower station of the Johnstown Inclined Plane. The bridge was listed on the National Register of Historic Places in 1988 and was documented by the Historic American Engineering Record (HAER) in 1997.

History
On May 31, 1889, the South Fork Dam on the Little Conemaugh River, upstream of Johnstown, collapsed. The resulting deluge devastated the city, killing over 2,000 people. As the city rebuilt, the Cambria Iron Company started work on a residential development atop Yoder Hill, overlooking the city. To provide easy transportation across the steep slope for the residents of the new community of Westmont, as well as to function as an escape route for future floods, the company opted to construct the Johnstown Inclined Plane, a funicular. A bridge had to be built to connect Johnstown to the lower station of the incline, on the opposite side of Stonycreek River as the city.

Work started on the bridge on June 11, 1890, with excavation of the bridge's abutments finished a week later. By March 20, 1891, only the approach to the bridge remained to be completed. The bridge, officially, was opened on June 1, 1891, at the same time as the incline. On March 17, 1936, nearly 4,000 people crowded on the approach, the bridge, and numerous boats to escape to higher ground via the incline as Stoneycreek and Conemaugh Rivers overflowed their banks. The floodwaters continued downstream and eventually reached Pittsburgh.

The Works Progress Administration appropriated $17,812 in October 1936 to repair the bridge's approach and replace stringers, handrails and the road deck. The Pennsylvania Department of Highways, the predecessor to the Pennsylvania Department of Transportation (PennDOT), acquired the bridge in 1964. It was listed on the National Register of Historic Places on June 22, 1988. On September 1, 2000, PennDOT undertook a $2.3 million renovation of the bridge and the access road leading to it. Work was suspended from April to September 2001, to allow operation of the incline. The renovations were completed on December 14, 2001, after PennDOT finished repairs to the bridge deck.

Design
The Inclined Plane Bridge was made from wrought iron and steel riveted together to form a Pennsylvania truss. The Pennsylvania, or Petit, truss is "essentially a Pratt truss" with the outermost horizontal girders being "polygonal" and having "subdivided panels" to "stiffen the truss under heavy loads."

See also 

List of bridges on the National Register of Historic Places in Pennsylvania
List of bridges documented by the Historic American Engineering Record in Pennsylvania
National Register of Historic Places listings in Cambria County, Pennsylvania

References

Sources

External links

Bridges completed in 1891
Road bridges on the National Register of Historic Places in Pennsylvania
Buildings and structures in Johnstown, Pennsylvania
Bridges in Cambria County, Pennsylvania
Pennsylvania truss bridges in the United States
Wrought iron bridges in the United States
Historic American Engineering Record in Pennsylvania
1891 establishments in Pennsylvania
National Register of Historic Places in Cambria County, Pennsylvania
Steel bridges in the United States